Stephen Geoffrey Cottrell  (born 31 August 1958) is a Church of England bishop. Since 9 July 2020, he has been the Archbishop of York and Primate of England; the second-most senior bishop of the church and the most senior in northern England. He previously served as Bishop of Reading (an area bishop in the Diocese of Oxford), 2004–2010, and as Bishop of Chelmsford, 2010–2020.

Early life and education
Cottrell was born on 31 August 1958 in Leigh-on-Sea, Essex. His brother, Professor David Cottrell, is a psychiatrist and academic. He was educated at Bellfairs High School for Boys, a secondary modern school, and then at the sixth form of Bellfairs High School for Girls. He studied at the Polytechnic of Central London, graduating with a Bachelor of Arts (BA) degree in media studies in 1979. From 1981 to 1984, he trained for ordination at St Stephen's House, Oxford. He later studied Christian leadership at St Mellitus College, London, graduating with a Master of Arts (MA) degree in 2019.

Ordained ministry
Cottrell was made a deacon at Petertide on 1 July 1984 and ordained a priest the next Petertide (30 June 1985), both times by Ronald Bowlby, Bishop of Southwark, at Southwark Cathedral. His ordained ministry began as a curate at Christ Church, Forest Hill in the Diocese of Southwark. From 1988 to 1993, he was priest in charge of St Wilfrid's Church, Chichester, and also assistant director of pastoral studies at Chichester Theological College. He was then diocesan missioner for the Diocese of Wakefield and finally, before his ordination to the episcopate, canon pastor at Peterborough Cathedral.

Episcopal ministry

Cottrell was nominated area Bishop of Reading on 6 January 2004, after Jeffrey John controversially withdrew his nomination to the post in 2003. He had been a supporter of John's original appointment. He said of his nomination: "I am looking forward to becoming the next Bishop of Reading with a mixture of excitement and trepidation. I believe my work in mission and evangelism has prepared me well for the challenges facing the church in this new century. I hope and pray that my love for and understanding of the different traditions of the Church of England will enable me to be a focus for unity in the Reading Episcopal area." He was consecrated on 4 May 2004 by Rowan Williams, Archbishop of Canterbury, at St Paul's Cathedral, following confirmation of the appointment by letters patent.

Following his nomination as bishop of Chelmsford on 22 March 2010, he was translated to the see of Chelmsford on 6 October 2010. He was installed at Chelmsford Cathedral on 27 November 2010. In 2014, he became a Lord Spiritual, one of the 26 senior diocesan bishops entitled to sit in the House of Lords; he was introduced on 25 March 2014.

On 17 December 2019, it was announced that Cottrell would succeed John Sentamu as Archbishop of York, Metropolitan of York and Primate of England, following the latter's retirement in June 2020. The position is the second-most senior clerical position in the Church of England after that of the Archbishop of Canterbury, Primate of All England. Cottrell's canonical election was held by video conference on 11 June 2020. The confirmation of his election, by which he legally took office, was held on 9 July, and his enthronement took place at York Minster during a service of Evensong on 18 October.

As a matter of course, Cottrell was appointed a Privy Counsellor on 21 July 2020. Now a Lord Spiritual ex officio, he was re-introduced on 22 October 2020.

Views
He is a member of the Society of Catholic Priests (SCP), and a member of Affirming Catholicism. In December 2014, he was selected as president of the movement, taking up the appointment at the start of 2015.

In 2007, Cottrell publicly opposed the renewal of Britain's Trident missile systems. The same year, his support for church celebrations of same-sex relationships was widely reported. In 2017, while serving as Bishop of Chelmsford, Cottrell said "Whether you believe there should be same sex marriage or the blessing of same sex unions or whether you do not, you are still a faithful Anglican...We need to find ways of living with this diversity, not being torn apart by it." He also stated that "there is no reason why prayers of thanksgiving for these [same-sex] relationships – perhaps a Eucharist – cannot be offered."

In August 2021, Cottrell was criticised for suggesting, in an article for the Daily Telegraph, that Welsh and Scottish sports teams should sing "God Save the Queen" along with the English team in all-British matches, saying that it would help to support the union. His idea met with angry responses on social media in Wales and Scotland.

Personal life
Stephen Cottrell is married to Rebecca and they have three children.
He is also a patron of the charity Antibiotic Research UK.

Styles
1984–2001: The Reverend Stephen Cottrell 
2001–2004: The Reverend Canon Stephen Cottrell
2004–2020: The Right Reverend Stephen Cottrell 
official: The Right Reverend The Bishop of Reading/of Chelmsford
2020: The Most Reverend Stephen Cottrell 
2020–present:
personal: The Most Reverend and Right Honourable Stephen Cottrell 
official: The Most Reverend and Right Honourable The Lord Archbishop of York and Primate of England

Selected works
Cottrell has written several books on the subject of evangelism among his 38 published titles.

Dear England: Finding Hope, Taking Heart and Changing the World (Hachette Book Group, March 2021); 
Hit the Ground Kneeling: Seeing Leadership Differently (Church House Publishing, November 2008); 
The Things He Carried (SPCK Publishing, November 2008); 
Do Nothing... Christmas is Coming: An Advent Calendar with a Difference (Church House Publishing, August 2008); 
Do Nothing to Change Your Life: Discovering What Happens When You Stop (Church House Publishing, May 2007); 
Abundance of the Heart: Catholic Evangelism for All Christians (Darton, Longman and Todd Ltd, May 2006); 
I Thirst: The Cross - The Great Triumph of Love (Zondervan Publishing House, January 2004); 
Praying through Life: How to Pray in the Home, at Work and in the Family (Church House Publishing; 2nd Revised edition, November 2003); 
On This Rock: Bible Foundations for Christian Living (The Bible Reading Fellowship, January 2003); 
Travelling Well: A Companion Guide to the Christian Faith (Church House Publishing, June 2000); 
Catholic Evangelism (Affirming Catholicism) (Darton, Longman and Todd Ltd, March 1998); 
Sacrament, Wholeness and Evangelism: A Catholic Approach (Grove Books Ltd, February 1996);

References

1958 births
21st-century Church of England bishops
21st-century Anglican archbishops
Alumni of St Stephen's House, Oxford
Alumni of the University of Westminster
Anglo-Catholic bishops
Bishops of Chelmsford
Bishops of Reading
Archbishops of York
Living people
Lords Spiritual
People from Leigh-on-Sea
English Anglo-Catholics
Members of the Privy Council of the United Kingdom
Alumni of St Mellitus College